Waltersdorf may refer to:

In Austria:
 Bad Waltersdorf, in the Hartberg district, Styria
 Waltersdorf an der March, a part of Drösing, Lower Austria
 Waltersdorf, part of Judenburg, Styria
 Waltersdorf, part of Neukirchen an der Vöckla, Upper Austria
 Waltersdorf, part of Staatz, Lower Austria

In Germany:
 Waltersdorf, Thuringia, in the Saale-Holzland district, Thuringia
 Waltersdorf, Heideblick, a part of Heideblick in the Dahme-Spreewald district, Brandenburg
 Waltersdorf, Schönefeld, a part of Schönefeld in the Dahme-Spreewald district, Brandenburg
 Waltersdorf, Löbau-Zittau, a part of Großschönau in the Löbau-Zittau district, Saxony
 Waltersdorf, Sächsische Schweiz, a part of Porschdorf in the Sächsische Schweiz district, Saxony

In the Czech Republic:
 An older name of Vrchy

In Poland:
 An older name of Mniszków
 An older name of Nielestno
 An older name of Niegosławice, Lubusz Voivodeship in the Silesian Voivodeship

In Romania:
 Waltersdorf, the German name for Dumitrița Commune, Bistriţa-Năsăud County